Administraţia Naţională de Meteorologie or ANM is the Romania government facility of weather prediction. The organisation's headquarters are in Bucharest. The organisation was founded in late 18th century. In 1948 Romania ratifies the 1947 Washington Convention, turning from founding member as a full member of the World Meteorological Organization1 (18 August 1948) 2.  Since 2003 is a member of EUMETSAT with a stake of 0.4456%. Today in Romania, ANM holds the monopoly for meteorological prediction because the state doesn't allow a private carrier in this field. Even if ANM holds monopoly on Romanian market, international media holdings and websites are usually using satellite prediction and the predictions of other meteorological institutions of Romania's neighborough. It is operated by Romanian Ministry of Environment.

External links
Official ANM website(in english)
Ministry of Environment website(in english)
Romania Weather by Counties
1http://www.meteoromania.ro/index.php?id=35
2https://web.archive.org/web/20111010091557/http://www.wmo.int/pages/members/membership/index_en.html

Governmental meteorological agencies in Europe